María bonita (English: Pretty María) is the seventh studio album by Mexican pop singer Manuel Mijares. It was released on May 19, 1992.

History
This album was produced by Bebu Silvetti. It has classic oldies of Agustín Lara, José Alfredo Jiménez, Tomás Méndez, Bobby Capó and Oswaldo Farrés, among others. The idea of this album was born when Mijares was performing to María Félix in a TV show hosted by Verónica Castro.

Track listing
Tracks:
 María Bonita
 Ella/ Cuando vivas conmigo/ Que bonito amor
 Quizá, quizá, quizá
 La Magaleña
 Ansiedad
 Palabras de mujer
 Noche de ronda
 Piel canela
 Mujer
 La media vuelta/ Retirada/ Amenecí en tus brazos
 Cucurrucucú paloma

Singles
 María Bonita
 Piel canela
 Quizá, quizá, quizá

Single charts

Album charts
The album reached the 5th position in Billboard Latin Pop Albums.

Notes 

1992 albums
Manuel Mijares albums
María Félix
Covers albums